75 Dollar Bill is a musical duo formed in New York City in 2012. Its members are Che Chen (guitar), formerly of True Primes, and Rick Brown (drums), formerly of V-Effect and Curlew. Sasha Frere-Jones described their music as displaying "a certain kind of formal fullness and technical freedom," which he said has helped introduce jazz to a new generation. Other critics have noted that their music shows signs of Mauritanian influences, because Chen studied Moorish music in Mauritania with Jheich Ould Chighaly in 2013. Their first full-length album, Wooden Bag, was released in 2015 by Other Music Recording Company. Their second album, Wood/Metal/Plastic/Pattern/Rhythm/Rock, was released in 2016 on the Los Angeles-based label Thin Wrist.

For their 2019 album, I Was Real, they expanded to a larger ensemble of players, which the Guardian described as "adding yet more depth to their placeless, gripping grooves". Since then they have self-released a series of live recordings through Bandcamp, including Power Failures and the Social Music at Troost series.

Discography
Wooden Bag (2015, Other Music)
Wood/Metal/Plastic/Pattern/Rhythm/Rock  (2016, Thin Wrist)
I Was Real (2019, Thin Wrist)

References

External links
Bandcamp

2012 establishments in New York City
Musical groups from New York City
Musical groups established in 2012
American musical duos
Jazz musicians from New York (state)